The Atatürk International Peace Prize is an award delivered since 1986 to award real people and organizations who have made memorable contributions to world peace in accordance of Kemal Atatürk's quotation, "Peace at Home, Peace in the World". It has been created during the presidency of coup leader Kenan Evren, by the Atatürk Association for Culture Language and History. The award is to be awarded to candidates nominated by members of non-governmental organizations, the Senate of Turkish universities and also the Secretary Generals of the United Nations and the Organization of Islamic Cooperation. The President of Turkey as well as the speaker of the Grand National Assembly of Turkey can also present candidates. After the prize was not awarded for 13 years after 2000, in 2013 it was decided to award it only every five years. An award was to be given in 2015, but was no ceremony is documented. The next award is planned to be given in 2020.

References 

Turkish awards
Peace awards
Awards established in 1986
Things named after Mustafa Kemal Atatürk